Mary Bernice Shedrick (born August 9, 1940) is a politician from the U.S. state of Oklahoma. Shedrick represented Oklahoma State Senate District 21 from 1980 to 1996. In 1994 she was a candidate for Governor of Oklahoma. Shedrick is now a part-time Administrative Law Judge in Payne and Logan counties and is a member of the Oklahoma Ethics Commission.

Early life
Shedrick was born in Chickasha, Oklahoma on August 9, 1940 to parents Irene May Williams-Link and Arthur Cole Link, Sr. Her father died when she was only 11 years old and her mother passed two years later. Shedrick's oldest brother's wife stayed with the siblings while her husband was overseas for the Korean War. The four siblings were later separated, all living with different family members. Shedrick moved with her older brother and wife to Wynnewood, Oklahoma. They later moved to Norman, OK where Shedrick met her husband. The two were married for 32 years then divorced in 1995, yet remained close friends until his death in 2006. Shedrick earned both her bachelor's and master's degrees from Oklahoma State University.

Shedrick taught in the Stillwater Public School system from 1969 to 1980  before running for a seat in the state senate.

Oklahoma Senate (1980-1996)
Elected in 1980, Shedrick was only the third woman to serve in the Oklahoma Senate. While serving in the Senate, Shedrick earned her Juris Doctor from the Oklahoma City University School of Law. In 1996 Shedrick was inducted into the Oklahoma Women's Hall of Fame. Shedrick focused on education during her time in the Senate. She served as primary author on HB 1017, also known as the Oklahoma Educational Reform Act, which was signed into law by Governor Henry Bellmon in April 1990. She was also an original author of HB 1286 which established the Oklahoma School of Science and Mathematics in 1983. There is a library in the school named after Shedrick.
 
In 1994, Shedrick ran in the gubernatorial election. Shedrick raised close to $900,000 for her campaign and traveled all over the state. Her opponent, Jack Mildren, won the run-off for the democratic candidacy and Shedrick returned to the Senate for her final two years in the political arena.

Committees
Appropriations Committee
Chair of Education Committee
Chair of Educational Appropriations Sub-Committee
Retirement Committee
Chair of Judiciary Committee
Economic Development Committee

Career After Office
After sixteen years of service in the state Senate, Shedrick left to spend more time with her family. Shedrick has two law offices, one in Stillwater and the other in Afton. She is also a member of the Ethics Commission in Oklahoma. Currently Shedrick serves part-time as Administrative Law Judge in Payne County and Logan County. She also makes an effort to spend as much time as she can with her grandchildren.

Awards and Achievements
Shedrick has been widely recognized for her achievements and contributions. Some of these recognitions include:

Inducted into the Oklahoma Women's Hall of Fame (1996)
American Jurisprudence Award
“Who’s Who of American Women in Politics” 
Outstanding Contribution Award from the University Center at Tulsa
Henry G. Bennett Distinguished Service Award

References

External links
 2005-2006 Oklahoma Almanac Online--Oklahoma History
 Women of the Oklahoma Legislature Oral History Project--OSU Library
"Senators Propose No Pass, No Play Stay With Schools" - The Oklahoman (1988)
"Shedrick Favors Universal Health Coverage Plan -- The Oklahoman (1994)

Women state legislators in Oklahoma
Democratic Party Oklahoma state senators
Living people
1940 births
People from Chickasha, Oklahoma
21st-century American women